The Miller House and Garden, also known as Miller House, is a mid-century modern home designed by Eero Saarinen and located in Columbus, Indiana, United States. The residence, commissioned by American industrialist, philanthropist, and architecture patron J. Irwin Miller and his wife Xenia Simons Miller in 1953, is now owned by Newfields. Miller supported modern architecture in the construction of a number of buildings throughout Columbus, Indiana. Design and construction on the Miller House took four years and was completed in 1957. The house stands at 2860 Washington St, Columbus Indiana, and was declared a National Historic Landmark in 2000. The Miller family owned the home until 2008, when Xenia Miller, the last resident of the home, died.

In 2009, the home and gardens, along with many of the original furnishings, were donated to the Indianapolis Museum of Art by members of the Miller family. In addition to Eero Saarinen, the house and gardens showcase the work of leading 20th-century figures such as interior designer Alexander Girard, landscape architect Dan Kiley, and principal design associate at the Saarinen office, Kevin Roche.

Architecture
As a friend of J. Irwin and Xenia Miller, Eero Saarinen had first designed a summer house in the Muskoka region of Ontario, Canada, for the family and was then asked to conceptualize and build the Miller House in Columbus, Indiana. The Miller house was meant to be a year-round residence, rather than just a vacation home. The Millers wanted a home in which they could entertain heads of state and titans of industry. At about 6,838 square feet, the Miller House is one of very few single family homes that Saarinen designed.

The Miller House epitomizes the modernist architectural tradition developed by Ludwig Mies van der Rohe with its open and flowing layout, flat roof, and stone and glass walls. Within the interior of the home, four non-public areas branch off from a central space, which features a conversation pit. These four branches include rooms for parents, children, guests and servants, and utilitarian areas (kitchen and laundry). The plan avoids a conventional axial organization, instead displacing the hierarchy of the rooms with a more egalitarian and functional arrangement. The geometry of the house's plan is similar to Andrea Palladio's 16th-century Villa Rotunda in its organization of rooms around a central space.

A grid pattern of skylights, supported by a set of sixteen free-standing cruciform steel columns, demonstrates concern for the interplay of light and shadow. A cylindrical fireplace, a 50-foot long storage wall, and the sunken conversation pit are key elements of the modern design of the central space.

The completed house was photographed in 1958 by Ezra Stoller for an article that appeared in The Architecture Forum. The Millers made only minor changes to the house over the years, including the removal of an interior wall in order to enlarge a guest room.

Landscape architecture
Saarinen brought in landscape architect Dan Kiley, with whom he had worked on the St. Louis Gateway Arch. Kiley wanted the landscape to be an extension of the home, loosely divided into three sections extending from the corresponding sections of the house, each with its own identity. The Miller House is an example of residential landscape design that puts a modernist face on formal European gardens, which rely on symmetry and geometry.

The plot of land, bounded by the Flatrock River on the west and Washington Street on the east, measures about 13.5 acres. Kiley left the long meadow that sweeps toward the river largely untouched, choosing to focus his attention on shaping spaces around the house. Much of the vegetation, like the weeping beeches on the west side of the house, were placed there strategically to protect living areas from natural intruders like sun and wind.

An allée of horse chestnut trees lines the entry drive, which reveals the house slowly as one approaches. The Millers did not want their home to be an imposing object in the landscape from the entrance of their property or from their neighbors' homes. Gridded blocks of apple trees are present on the lawn farther east. The easternmost edge of the property is planted with staggered blocks of arborvitae, creating a hedge that serves as a porous boundary. The garden areas to the north of the house were originally planted with redbuds, which were later replaced with crabapples. In the southwest corner there is a swimming pool also surrounded by arborvitae hedges.

One of the most notable features of the landscape design is the allée of honey locust trees that runs along the west side of the house which frames the view of the meadow and the river beyond it. The allée received a terminus at each end in subsequent years: Henry Moore's Draped Reclining Woman at the north end, and a bas relief by Jacques Lipchitz at the south. As part of a landscape renovation conducted by Michael Van Valkenburgh Associates, Inc. of Cambridge, MA, the Honey Locust allée was replanted in the Spring of 2008. The iconic Moore sculpture was sold and removed from garden following Xenia Miller's death in 2008.

The grounds underwent an extensive landscape refresh in 2022, especially on the areas surround the swimming pool and both orchards.

Interior design

Architect and interior designer Alexander Girard worked closely with the Millers to furnish the residence. His choices for fabrics, textiles, furniture, and ornaments are said to bring warmth and color to the rectilinearity and geometry of the house.

Girard designed a 50-foot storage wall made up of cabinets, bookshelves, and niches that allow equipment to remain hidden while the Millers' eclectic objects can be displayed. Some of these objects included folk art from Mexico, Asia, and Eastern Europe. He designed patterns for many of the curtains in the house, as well as several rugs. One of the latter is composed of emblems that represent family history and interests. His designs for cushions for the dining room chairs feature the initials of family members. Girard is credited with suggesting the idea of the conversation pit, which eliminates the look of cluttered seating in the expansive living room, reinforcing the linearity of the architecture.

See also
Oldfields

References

External links

 Official site
 Official tour site

Eero Saarinen structures
Columbus, Indiana
Houses on the National Register of Historic Places in Indiana
National Historic Landmarks in Indiana
Museums in Bartholomew County, Indiana
Historic house museums in Indiana
Modernist architecture in Indiana
National Historic Landmarks in Columbus, Indiana
Tourist attractions in Bartholomew County, Indiana
National Register of Historic Places in Bartholomew County, Indiana
Decorative art of the Indianapolis Museum of Art
Houses in Bartholomew County, Indiana
1957 establishments in Indiana
Indianapolis Museum of Art